Edna Manley College of the Visual and Performing Arts, formerly Jamaica School of Art and Crafts, is an art school in Kingston, Jamaica. In 1940, Edna Manley pioneered evening art classes at the Institute of Jamaica's Junior Centre but it was not until 1950 that the first formal arts school opened at the DaCosta Institute at 1 Central Avenue, Kingston Gardens. A number of leading Jamaican artists collaborated with Manley to open the first art school in Jamaica, including Albert Huie who became one of the tutors. 64 paying students enrolled in the first year and due to unexpected interest expanded the school at 11 North Street.

History
Barrington Watson established a four-year Diploma curriculum to the teaching of Art when the country gained independence in 1962. By 1964-65 the college had 86 full-time and 84 part-time students.

After being renamed in 1967 to the Jamaica School of Art, in 1976 the school was incorporated into the Cultural Training Centre and moved to its new facilities at 1 Arthur Wint Drive, expanding its scope to include Art, Music, Dance, and Drama governed by the Institute of Jamaica under the Ministry of Culture.

In 1987 Edna Manley died and it was later officially designated a college in 1995, renamed as the Edna Manley College of the Visual and Performing Arts.

In September 2004 the School of Visual Arts launched its degree program and today offers Bachelor of Fine Arts (BFA) and a Bachelor of Art Education (BAE) degrees and a BA degree course offered jointly with the University of the West Indies. There is also a Continuing Education division that offers part-time courses. College contact: (876) 619-EDNA (3362)

Faculties
The College consists of the following faculties:
 The School of Visual Arts
 The School of Music
 The School of Dance
 The School of Drama
 The Faculty of Education and Liberal Studies
 The School of Continuing Education and Allied Programmes

Notable alumni
Heather Doram, artist and educator, who designed the national costume of Antigua and Barbuda.

See also
Edna Manley

References

External links
 Aerial view
 College Website

Universities in Jamaica
Education in Kingston, Jamaica
Educational institutions established in 1995
Buildings and structures in Kingston, Jamaica
1995 establishments in Jamaica